Forsyth County Courthouse is a historic county courthouse located at Winston-Salem, Forsyth County, North Carolina.  It was built in 1926, and is a three-story, limestone clad, Beaux-Arts style building that incorporates interior elements of the earlier 1896, Romanesque Revival style courthouse.  Between 1959 and 1960, additions were built onto the front and rear. It has been converted into private apartments and in 2018, was owned by Winston Courthouse LLC. In front of it for decades was the Confederate Soldiers Monument, which was removed in 2019.

It was listed on the National Register of Historic Places in 2013.

References

County courthouses in North Carolina
Courthouses on the National Register of Historic Places in North Carolina
Beaux-Arts architecture in North Carolina
Romanesque Revival architecture in North Carolina
Government buildings completed in 1926
Buildings and structures in Winston-Salem, North Carolina
National Register of Historic Places in Winston-Salem, North Carolina